The 1981 Writers Guild of America strike was a 3-month strike action taken to establish compensation in the then-new markets of "pay TV" and home video. Most scripted television series seasons started much later than originally planned as a result.

See also 

 1981–82 United States network television schedule
 International Affiliation of Writers Guilds (IAWG)
 WGA screenwriting credit system
 WGA script registration service
 1960 Writers Guild of America strike
 1988 Writers Guild of America strike
 2007-2008 Writers Guild of America strike
 List of Hollywood strikes

References

Writers Guild Of America Strike, 1981
Writers
Writers Guild of America strike
Writers Guild of America strike
Strike, 1981
Entertainment industry labor disputes in the United States